Washington Park is a public urban park in Portland in the U.S. state of Oregon. It includes a zoo, forestry museum, arboretum, rose garden, Japanese garden, amphitheatre, memorials, archery range, tennis courts, soccer field, picnic areas, playgrounds, public art and many acres of wild forest with miles of trails.

It comprises  of city park land that has been officially designated as "Washington Park" by the City of Portland, as well as the adjacent  Oregon Zoo and the  Hoyt Arboretum, which together make up the area described as "Washington Park" on signs and maps.

History 

The City of Portland purchased the original  of Washington Park in 1871 from Amos King for $32,624, a controversially high price for the time. The area, designated "City Park", was wilderness with few roads. Thick brush, trees and roaming cougar discouraged access. In the mid-1880s, Charles M. Meyers was hired as park keeper. A former seaman without landscape training, he transformed the park by drawing on memories of his native Germany and European parks. By 1900, there were roads, trails, landscaped areas with lawns, manicured hedges, flower gardens, and a zoo.  Cable cars were added in 1890 and operated until the 1930s. The City of Portland constructed two reservoirs in the park in 1893 and 1894.

In 1903, John Charles Olmsted of Olmsted Brothers, a nationally known landscape architecture firm, recommended several changes to the park including the present name, location of the entrance, separate roads and pedestrian paths, and replacement of formal gardens with native species. The name was officially changed from City Park to Washington Park in 1909.

Portland's zoo was founded in Washington Park in 1888 near the north end of the park. The bear house from the original zoo became a park maintenance shed; the 2018 Washington Park Master Plan calls for evaluation of whether the historic bear house should be restored as a maintenance facility or demolished. The zoo moved in 1925 to what is now the site of the Japanese Garden. The only surviving structure from the second zoo is the elephant barn, now converted into a picnic shelter and decorated with tile mosaic of various animals and a life-size brick relief sculpture of an elephant and calf. The zoo moved again in 1959 to its present location at the park's southern edge.

In 1958, the Oregon Museum of Science and Industry (OMSI) moved into a new building in the southwest corner of Washington Park, adjacent to the new zoo. In 1971, the Western Forestry Center (now the World Forestry Center) opened a forestry museum north of OMSI. OMSI moved out of the park to a new location in 1992, and the Portland Children's Museum took over OMSI's former building in 2001. The Children's Museum closed in 2021.

On March 15, 2018, the Portland City Council adopted a master plan to guide development of Washington Park over the next 20 years. The plan called for improved transportation and accessibility within the park, as well as improvements to park features such as the arboretum.

The City of Portland is in the process of replacing the two outdoor reservoirs with underground reservoirs covered by reflecting pools, due to their age and a federal mandate to cover all reservoirs. The project is expected to be completed by the end of 2023. The $67 million project attracted opposition from historical preservationists and residents concerned about construction impacts.

Notable features 

The Wildwood Trail through Forest Park begins in Washington Park near the Oregon Vietnam Veterans Memorial. In 2019, the City of Portland constructed Barbara Walker Crossing at the northern edge of Washington Park to allow Wildwood Trail users to safely pass over West Burnside Street. 

 The International Rose Test Garden is the oldest official, continuously operated, public rose test garden in the United States. Dedicated in 1924, it displays more than 10,000 rose plants of more than 650 varieties. It includes a Shakespeare garden within its boundaries, and borders an alpine garden at its southern end and a secluded oval-shaped "secret garden" to the north.
 The Washington Park Amphitheater is located in the Rose Garden and hosts many public concerts, including the Washington Park Summer Festival, an annual free concert series normally presented in August.
 The Oregon Zoo, which opened at its current site in 1959, contains more than 2,500 animals of more than 200 species (including 15 endangered and 7 threatened species) in natural or semi-natural habitats. The zoo has a notable Asian elephant breeding program that grew out of the birth in 1962 of Packy, who in adulthood was the largest example of the species in North America.

 The Washington Park & Zoo Railway is a 1950s-era,  narrow gauge railroad designed to carry passengers on a  line between the Rose Garden and the zoo. It was opened in phases from 1958 to 1960. Currently, it is partially closed because of needed maintenance on retaining walls and culverts as it runs through the woods; until that work is done, it operates only within the zoo.
 The Portland Japanese Garden is a  private traditional Japanese garden that opened in 1967. It was the most highly ranked Japanese garden in North America of more than 300 such gardens rated by experts from The Journal of Japanese Gardening in 2013.

 The World Forestry Center Discovery Museum offers educational exhibits on forests and forest-related subjects. It was founded in 1906 in the Forestry Building of the Lewis and Clark Centennial Exposition in Northwest Portland, and later established in Washington Park in 1971. Permanent exhibits explore the traits of forests around the world. Temporary exhibits have featured art (usually related to nature), ecology, wildlife and woodcrafts.

 The Oregon Vietnam Veterans Memorial was dedicated in 1987 to honor Oregonians who were killed or missing in action.
 The Rose Garden Children's Park is a playground that was completed in 1995 with $2 million in donations. It includes a large, colorful play structure designed to accommodate all children, including those with disabilities. Adjacent to the Children's Park is the Elephant House picnic shelter, converted from the old zoo's elephant barn.

 The Washington Park station is located beneath Les AuCoin Plaza, a scenic xeriscaped brick and stone terraced plaza located between the zoo and the World Forestry Center. The station is accessed by four high-speed elevators. It opened for service on September 12, 1998.
 The Portland Children's Museum moved into the Oregon Museum of Science and Industry's former building in 2001, and closed in 2021. The Children's Museum built a substantial outdoor play area on its grounds in 2014 called "Outdoor Adventure". The Washington Park Master Plan calls for Outdoor Adventure to be maintained as a public nature play area following the museum's closure.
 The Oregon Holocaust Memorial was dedicated to the victims of the Holocaust on August 29, 2004.
 The Himalayan Cloud Forest Garden, created around 2010 on a 3-acre site at the northern end of the park, displays a collection over 200 rhododendron species and hundreds of companion plants primarily from the Sino-Himalayan region.

The veterans memorial, zoo, children's museum, forestry center and the MAX station surround a large parking lot in the southwestern portion of the park. The arboretum is located just to the north of these. The gardens, amphitheater, playgrounds and the Holocaust Memorial are in the northeast section of the park.

Image gallery

Public art and fountains 

 Chiming Fountain, also referred to as Washington Park Fountain, is so-called because of the sound the falling water makes. It is an ornate concrete, bronze and iron fountain with gargoyles. It was created in 1891 by the Swiss artisan woodcarver Hans Staehli in the style of a Renaissance fountain.
 The Lewis and Clark Memorial Column is a granite monument sculpted by Otto Schumann that was dedicated by President Theodore Roosevelt on May 21, 1903, to honor the discovery of the northwest by the Lewis and Clark Expedition.

 Coming of the White Man is a bronze statue of two Native Americans, one depicting Chief Multnomah, sculpted by Hermon Atkins MacNeil in 1904 and donated by the heirs of David P. Thompson. It faces east along the Oregon Trail.
 Sacajawea and Jean-Baptiste is a statue of the famed Shoshone Native American woman who guided the Lewis and Clark Expedition through the mountains. A massive bronze and copper piece unveiled on July 7, 1905, at the Lewis and Clark centennial, it was sculpted by Denver resident Alice Cooper and cast in New York.
 Loyal B. Stearns Memorial Fountain, erected in 1941 in honor of the former Oregon judge Loyal B. Stearns, is located in the northeastern corner of Washington Park, just south of Burnside Street.
 The Continuity of Life Forms is a mosaic by Portland architect and artist Willard Martin. It was originally installed at the former entrance to the Oregon Zoo (then known as the Portland Zoological Gardens) in 1959. It was re-installed outside of the zoo's new education center in July 2016, near the zoo's old entrance.
 Frank E. Beach Memorial Fountain (officially titled Water Sculpture), a stainless steel fountain located in the Rose Garden, was designed and built by Oregon artist Lee Kelly and dedicated in 1975. 
 House for Summer is a living sculpture of Himalayan birch trees planted by artist Helen Lessick in the Hoyt Arboretum in 1987. The sculpture reflects the shelter of the forest canopy and changes with the seasons. Park arborists maintain the work under a joint agreement with Portland's Regional Arts and Culture Council.
 Royal Rosarian is a bronze statue located in the Rose Garden that depicts a Royal Rosarian tipping his hat. It was created by American artist Bill Bane and dedicated in 2011.
 Basket of Air is a stainless and galvanized steel spherical sculpture by Portland artist Ivan McLean, inspired by bamboo baskets. It is suspended over the pond in the Hoyt Arboretum's Bamboo Forest and was installed in 2016.

In 2001, a memorial bench and plaque north of the Lewis and Clark Memorial were created to honor the Portland born journalist John Reed. The plaque has a quotation by Reed on his native city:

Public access

Parking in Washington Park costs $2 per hour, to a maximum of $8 per day. 
The Washington Park light rail station provides regional public transit access to the park's west end, including the Oregon Zoo. Public transit service within the park is provided by the Washington Park Shuttle, a free service that connects with MAX light rail at the Washington Park station and since 2022 operates seven days a week year-round. Additionally, TriMet bus route 63-Washington Park/Arlington Heights, which has operated seven days a week and year-round for many years, serves stops at the east end of the park (including at the Rose Garden and Japanese Garden), but since May 2022 no longer passes through any portion of the park. The northeastern corner of the park, at NW 23rd Place and W. Burnside, is served by bus route 20-Burnside/Stark, which runs seven days a week.

See also

Peacock in the Park

References

External links 

Explore Washington Park website
City of Portland Parks information

 
1871 establishments in Oregon
Historic American Engineering Record in Oregon
Parks in Portland, Oregon
Protected areas established in 1871
Urban public parks